Two Worlds is the German version of an English-language film directed by Ewald André Dupont.

Cast 
 Helene Sieburg - Esther Goldschneider
 Hermann Vallentin - Uhrmacher Simon Goldschneider
 Friedrich Kayßler - Oberst von Kaminsky
 Peter Voß - Leutnant Stanislaus von Kaminsky
 Maria Paudler - Mizzi Staudinger
 Julius Brandt - Korporal
 Paul Graetz - Schumacher Mendel
 Anton Pointner - Hauptmann Ballentin
 Fritz Spira - Major
 Harry Terry - Plünderer
 Boris Ranevsky - Russischer Fähnrich
 Leo Monosson - Österreichischer Soldat
 Rudolf Meinhard-Jünger - Ordonanzsoldat
 Michael von Newlinsky - Ordonnanzoffizier

References

External links 

1930 films
1930s war drama films
1930 multilingual films
German war drama films
1930s German-language films
Films directed by E. A. Dupont
Films with screenplays by Franz Schulz
World War I films set on the Eastern Front
Films about Jews and Judaism
German multilingual films
Films shot at British International Pictures Studios
German black-and-white films
British multilingual films
1930 drama films
1930s German films